The All-Russian Social-Political Movement “Spiritual Heritage” (Vserossiyskoye obshchestvenno-politicheskoye dvizheniye "Dukhovnoye naslediye") also known as Spiritual Heritage or Spiritual Legacy (Dukhovnoye naslediye) was a nationalist political party in Russia. Its orientation has been characterized as moderately “national-imperial” (as opposed to ethnic nationalist)  or as a “national-religious revision of communism”.

The movement was founded in 1995 by Alexey Podberezkin, the president of the RAU Corporation and worked in symbiosis with the Communist Party of the Russian Federation until autumn 1998: members of the Spiritual Heritage movements participated in the 1995 State Duma election within the CPRF list, and Gennady Zyuganov on the other hand belonged to the leadership of the Spiritual Heritage (and according to some sources, was strongly influenced by Podberyozkin's political philosophy). The movement was one of the initiators and members of the pro-communist umbrella organization People's Patriotic Union of Russia  that gathered supporters of G. Zyuganov's presidential bid. The Spiritual Heritage movement eventually decided to participate independently in the 1999 State Duma election (Podberyozkin also considered running in the Fatherland list, for which reason he was expelled from the CPRF State Duma faction).

The ideology of the Spiritual Heritage movement can be characterized as statist, supporting a resurrection of the traditionally strong Russian state and favouring for this reason the rallying of nationalist forces around the CPRF as the main vehicle for statist ideology.

Since 1998, close relations between the movement and the Communist Party started to wane; Alexey Podberyozkin ran independently at the 2000 Russian presidential election and endorsed Vladimir Putin in the second round. In 2003, members of the Spiritual Heritage founded the United Socialist Party of Russia.

References

Defunct nationalist parties in Russia
Russian nationalist organizations
National Bolshevism
National Bolshevik parties